Alexis Peterman is an English actress best known for her role as receptionist Lauren Porter in the BBC soap opera, Doctors.

Early life 
Peterman was born and raised in Edgbaston, Birmingham.  From years two to 18, she attended Edgbaston High School for Girls. At 14, Peterman was scouted by London's Models 1 modeling agency, working with them until matriculating to drama school. Peterman is of Welsh and Polish Ashkenazi Jewish descent.

Peterman's maternal great-grandmother was the Yiddish theatre actress, Becky Goldstein. "Born in Mlava, Poland, moved to England at the age of 12.  She became an actress at the Pavilion later transferring to the Grand Palais.  A specialist in archetypal 'Yiddishe mama' roles, she left the stage owing to ill health." Goldstein was married to the actor and playwright, Joseph Markovitch, who "joined the Pavilion Theatre as an actor and playwright. A prolific dramatist and lyricist, he wrote such plays as The Revolutionary, Mendel Beilis, The Gambler, The Two Chaverim, and The Desert. In later years, until his retirement in 1960, he belonged to the Grand Palais company."

Career 
After a three-year degree course at Arts Educational Schools, London, Peterman starred in various stage roles. She then undertook a series of supporting roles in various television productions, including: Footballers Wives, Dream Team, Hotel Babylon and Lip Service.

Peterman first starred in Doctors, as Phoebe Billington, in a single episode in 2009, but returned in 2011 to play murdered receptionist, Lauren Porter. Her performance garnered a Best Storyline and Best Episode nomination at The British Soap Awards 2012.

In 2013, Peterman played the role of Natalie Fisher in the HBO/Sky1 British action and military television series, Strike Back.

She can be seen in Survivor, the 2015 British-American spy thriller film starring Pierce Brosnan, Milla Jovovich, and Dylan McDermott, and directed by James McTeigue.

Peterman starred as the lead in the Syfy channel made-for-television movie, Roboshark, which kicked off Sharknado week 2015.

In 2012, Peterman - alongside her partner, actor, Dar Dash - conceived Drink Me Eat Me, a “treat boutique” and event space, to serve the local community tasty treats, sell locally produced handmade treasures, and host parties, events, classes, pop-up shops and dinners.  Drink Me Eat quickly became a bustling hub of West London.
To concentrate on their careers, Peterman and Dash sold the company in August 2015.

Alongside acting, Peterman is a prolific voice over artist, lending her voice to well known British and international brands.

In 2021, whilst heavily pregnant with her second child, Peterman was given the opportunity to play Rabbi Rachel in a film directed by Israeli director, Maya Armon. The film is loosely based on Rabbi Rebecca Birk, whom in 2016, the Evening Standard listed as one of London's most influential people.

Peterman guest stars in 2022’s season 11 of the popular BBC drama series, Call The Midwife.
The episode focuses on a Jewish couple suffering the effects of post traumatic stress after surviving the holocaust.

Filmography

Film and Television

References

External links

Year of birth missing (living people)
Living people
British television actresses
English film actresses
English television actresses
English female models
English stage actresses
English people of Welsh descent
English people of Jewish descent
Jewish English actresses
Jewish British actresses
21st-century Welsh actresses
People from Edgbaston
English people of Polish-Jewish descent
English Jews
English soap opera actresses
Jewish female models
21st-century English actresses